Johnny Cannizzaro (born 21 June 1949) is a Puerto Rican sports shooter. He competed in the men's 50 metre free pistol event at the 1976 Summer Olympics.

References

1949 births
Living people
Puerto Rican male sport shooters
Olympic shooters of Puerto Rico
Shooters at the 1976 Summer Olympics
Place of birth missing (living people)
Pan American Games medalists in shooting
Pan American Games bronze medalists for Puerto Rico
Shooters at the 1979 Pan American Games